The England women's cricket team toured South Africa in October 2011, playing three One Day Internationals and three Twenty20 Internationals. England won the one-day series 3–0, and the Twenty20 series 2–0, with one match lost to rain.

Squads

One Day International series

1st ODI

2nd ODI

3rd ODI

Twenty20 International series

1st T20I

2nd T20I

3rd T20I

References

Women's international cricket tours of South Africa
2011 in South African cricket
2011 in women's cricket
2011 in South African women's sport
South Africa Women
England Women
South Africa 2011
Women 2011
International cricket competitions in 2011
October 2011 sports events in Africa